Is There Love in Space? is the tenth studio album by guitarist Joe Satriani, released on April 13, 2004, through Epic Records. The album reached No. 80 on the U.S. Billboard 200 and remained on that chart for two weeks, as well as reaching the top 100 in three other countries.

Overview
Recording for Is There Love in Space? took place from late 2003 to early 2004 and the title was announced on March 22, 2004. Notably, Satriani sings for the first time since his self-titled 1995 album, Joe Satriani, on the songs "Lifestyle" and "I Like the Rain".

Coldplay plagiarism allegation
On December 4, 2008, a lawsuit was filed by Satriani accusing the band Coldplay of plagiarizing "substantial original portions" of his song "If I Could Fly" on their 2008 song "Viva la Vida". The case was dismissed by the California Central District Court on September 14, 2009, with both parties allegedly agreeing to an undisclosed settlement.

Track listing

Personnel

Joe Satriani – vocals, guitar, keyboard, bass, harmonica, engineering, production
Jeff Campitelli – drums, percussion
Matt Bissonette – bass
John Cuniberti – tambourine, engineering
Z.Z. Satriani – bass (track 11)
Mike Manning – sound effects (track 9)
Eric Caudieux – digital editing
Justin Phelps – engineering assistance
Mike Boden – engineering assistance
Mike Fraser – mixing
George Marino – mastering

Chart performance

Weekly charts

References

External links
In Review: Joe Satriani "Is There Love In Space?" at Guitar Nine Records

Joe Satriani albums
2004 albums
Epic Records albums